David Francis may refer to:

David Francis (author) (born 1958), Australian novelist and lawyer
Panama Francis (David Francis, 1918–2001), American drummer
David R. Francis (1850–1927), American politician
David Hywel Francis (born 1946), Welsh politician
David Francis (cyclist), former member of the USA Cycling team
Dave Francis (born 1941), Ohio State Buckeyes football player
David Francis (film archivist) (born 1935), former curator of the UK's National Film and Television Archive
David J. Francis (actor) (born 1970), Canadian actor and director
David J. Francis (academic), American psychologist
David J. Francis (politician), Sierra Leonean politician

See also
Dai Francis (disambiguation)